The Gwinnett County Police Department is the main law enforcement agency in Gwinnett County, Georgia. The department has about a thousand employees with 878 sworn law enforcement officers. The head of the agency is Brett West.

History
The department has suffered five officers killed in its history. Three of them were murdered on 17 April 1964 in a single attack. The department had about a dozen officers at the time. Three of them were driving home in one car when they came upon three men who were stripping a stolen car for parts. The bodies of Officers Ralph King Davis, Jerry Everett, and Marvin Gravitt were found bound in their own handcuffs and shot with their own guns. Venson Williams and Alec Evans were sentenced to death. Both sentences were commuted to life in 1971. Williams was released on parole in 1989. Evans died in prison in 2016, having served fifty years for the murder. The third man, Wade Truett cooperated with government in exchange for immunity.

In 2019, the department was featured on episodes of the police documentary television series The First 48.

Organization
The department is organized with two bureaus and four divisions: Administrative Services, Support Operations, Criminal Investigations and Uniform Divisions.

See also
 List of law enforcement agencies in Georgia

References

County police departments of Georgia (U.S. state)
Gwinnett County, Georgia